FC Akzhayik is a Kazakhstani professional football club, based in Oral, current member of the Kazakhstan First Division.

History

Names
1968 : Founded as Uralets
1993 : The club was renamed Uralets-Arma for sponsorship reasons
1997 : The club was renamed Zhangir
1998 : The club was renamed Naryn
1999 : The club was renamed Batys
2004 : The club was renamed Akzhayik

Domestic history

Honours
Kazakhstan First Division (1): 2015

Current squad

Managers
 Boris Zhuravlyov (2003–04)
 Bauyrzhan Baimukhammedov (2006)
 Andrey Chernyshov (Jan 29, 2010 – June 30, 2011)
 Jozef Škrlík (Feb 16, 2012 – Dec 31, 2012)
 Poghos Galstyan (Feb 27, 2013 – June 4, 2013)
 Ljupko Petrović (July 14, 2013 – July 14, 2014)
 Sergei Volgin (July 14, 2014 – June 17, 2015)
 Talgat Baysufinov (July 17, 2015 – ?)
 Artur Avakyants (2016 ?)
 Vakhid Masudov (2016 – December 2017)
 Volodymyr Mazyar (17 December 2017 – 15 May 2018)
 Serhiy Zaytsev (25 July 2018 – 20 April 2019)
 Volodymyr Mazyar (12 January 2021 – 10 July 2022)
 Igor Picușceac (14 July 2022 – 21 August 2022)
 Oleg Bejenar (21 August 2022 – present)

References

External links 
 

 
Football clubs in Kazakhstan
Association football clubs established in 1968
1968 establishments in the Kazakh Soviet Socialist Republic
Sport in Oral, Kazakhstan